Sean T. Drinkwater (born 1972) is a musician living and working in Boston, Massachusetts. He is best known as one of the four members of the synthpop band Freezepop, in which he performs under the name The Other Sean T. Drinkwater, posing as a clone of the original Drinkwater. He is also a member of Lifestyle, Karacter, and Veronica Black Morpheus Nipple, as well as of several currently unsigned bands. He is a founding partner of Archenemy Record Company. His commercial work includes the song "Boy Band" for Milwaukee's Best Light.

References

External links
 Freezepop official website
 Lifestyle official website
 Boston Phoenix feature on Karacter

1972 births
Living people
Freezepop members
Place of birth missing (living people)
Keytarists
21st-century American keyboardists